Cindy-Lu Bailey , also known as Cindy-Lu Fitzpatrick, (born 8 March 1965) is a former Australian deaf swimmer who has represented Australia in both Commonwealth Games and in Deaflympics. She is considered to be the most decorated woman in Deaflympics history with a record haul of 29 medals, which is the highest among women in Deaflympics. Bailey is also one of the greatest swimmers of Australia in history. 

Her record haul of 29 medals is also the third most by a Deaflympic athlete (among men and women) just behind Terence Parkin's haul of 33 medals and Reed Gershwind's haul of 30 medals. Her medal tally of 29, is also the highest medal count for Australia in Deaflympics history.

Career 
As a deaf swimmer, Bailey wasn't able to hear the starter gun despite her success at the Deaflympics.

She made her Deaflympics debut at the age of just 12 during the 1977 Summer Deaflympics where she also managed to win a bronze medal.

Bailey has also claimed national titles for Australia in the 100 m and 200 m breaststroke in 1980s, when she was just 16 years old.

She then represented the national team in the Commonwealth Games in 1982 and in 1986. She has also participated at the Pan Pacific Games. In 1982, she was ranked within the top 16 on the Speedo World Rankings list.

Bailey was awarded the Order of Australia Medal in 1985 for her services towards the sport and for her dedication despite having deafness.

Bailey has competed at the Deaflympics on 6 occasions (1977, 1981, 1985, 1989, 1993 and 1997) and finished her medal hunt with 19 gold, 5 silver and 5 bronze medals.  

In 2002, she became the only woman to be inducted into the New South Wales (NSW) Hall of Champions.

At the 2005 Summer Deaflympics held in Melbourne, she was given the honour of lighting cauldron (flame bearer). In fact became the only woman to be given such an opportunity in Deaflympic history. Baliley was also a torchbearer during the 2000 Summer Olympics.

In 2013, she voted as one of Australia's Top 100 sportswomen of all time.

Post swimming career 

Cindy-Lu Bailey married Rodney, an Australian surfer. They have two children, Tara and Lily.

At present, she works at the University of Newcastle as Auslan Professor as well as she serves as the Technical Director of swimming for the International Committee of Sports for the Deaf.

Awards 
 1985: Medal of the Order of Australia (OAM)

 1999: Sports deaf sports woman of the Year Finalist
 2001: Medal of honour winner

References 

Deaf swimmers
Living people
1965 births
Australian female breaststroke swimmers
Australian female freestyle swimmers
Australian female medley swimmers
Australian deaf people
Deaflympic gold medalists for Australia
Deaflympic silver medalists for Australia
Deaflympic bronze medalists for Australia
Recipients of the Medal of the Order of Australia